Bristlr is a location-based social search mobile app that facilitates communication between bearded men and women who love beards, allowing matched users to chat.

Overview
Bristlr was founded by John Kershaw in 2014. The app is popular in Canada, the Netherlands, the United Kingdom and the United States.

See also

Comparison of online dating services
Timeline of online dating services

References

External links
Bristlr Official Website
Single Parents Social Network

IOS software
Geosocial networking
Mobile social software
Online dating services of the United Kingdom
Proprietary cross-platform software
Computer-related introductions in 2014
Android (operating system) software